Lamis al-Alami (born 1943) is a Palestinian educator and politician. She was Minister of Education and Higher Education in the Palestinian Authority Governments of June–July 2007 and Palestinian Authority Government of May 2009, and a commissioner of the Central Elections Commission of Palestine.

Al-Alami was born in Jerusalem and educated at the Schmidt's Girls College in the city. She then obtained a BA in English from the American University of Beirut in 1964, a Master's in English literature in 1967, and a Master's in Linguistics at the University of Edinburgh in 1974.

She taught at UNRWA's women's college in Ramallah from 1975, became its deputy director in 1983 and its manager in 1994, in which year she also became responsible for education in all of UNRWA's 100 schools and three colleges. She retired from this in 2004. She was later the Director General of The Independent Commission for Human Rights.

She is a director of the Coalition for Accountability and Integrity (AMAN).

References

1943 births
Living people
Women government ministers of the Palestinian National Authority
Government ministers of the Palestinian National Authority
Education ministers
Alumni of the University of Edinburgh
American University of Beirut alumni
Politicians from Jerusalem
20th-century educators
20th-century Israeli women politicians